2015–16 Premier League may refer to a number of professional sports league seasons:

 Basketball

 2015–16 Icelandic Premier League
 2015–16 Irish Premier League season

 Association football

 2015–16 Armenian Premier League
 2015–16 Azerbaijan Premier League
 2015–16 Premier League of Belize
 2015–16 Premier League of Bosnia and Herzegovina
 2015–16 Egyptian Premier League
 2015–16 Premier League (England)
 2015–16 Premier League International Cup
 2015–16 Hong Kong Premier League
 2015–16 Israeli Premier League
 2015–16 Kuwaiti Premier League
 2015–16 Lebanese Premier League
 2015–16 Maltese Premier League
 2015–16 National Premier League (Jamaica)
 2015–16 Premier Soccer League (South Africa)
 2015–16 Russian Premier League
 2015–16 Syrian Premier League
 2015–16 Tanzanian Premier League
 2015–16 Ukrainian Premier League
 2015–16 Welsh Premier League

 Cricket

2015–16 Bangladesh Premier League
2015–16 Premier League Tournament (Sri Lanka)